Valeria Cappellotto (28 January 1970 – 17 September 2015) was an Italian racing cyclist. She represented her native country at two Summer Olympics: 1992 and 2000. Alessandra Cappellotto was her sister.

Cappellotto died on the morning of 17 September 2015 in Marano Vicentino from an incurable illness at the age of 45.

References

External links

1970 births
2015 deaths
Italian female cyclists
Cyclists at the 1992 Summer Olympics
Cyclists at the 2000 Summer Olympics
Olympic cyclists of Italy
Cyclists from the Province of Vicenza
Disease-related deaths in Veneto